Tom Green (born August 29, 1949) is an American basketball coach and former player. He is the former head basketball coach at the City College of New York.  He was previously the head coach at Fairleigh Dickinson University in Hackensack / Teaneck, New Jersey, where he led the team to a 407–351 record in 26 seasons leading the team.  Green had led the Knights to two National Invitation Tournament bids and four NCAA Men's Division I Basketball Championship appearances, the most recent in 2004–05 when the team played the top-seeded University of Illinois and lost by 12 points after trailing by one at the half, losing to a team that lost in the National Championship game to the University of North Carolina. His 407 wins were the most in FDU history and he has the most wins of any coach in Northeast Conference play with a 263–129 record in NEC games.

Green led the Fairleigh Dickinson University Knights to postseason tournament championships in the Northeast Conference in 1985, 1988, 1998 and 2005, and won league regular season titles in 1986, 1988 and again in 2006. Green was named Northeast Conference Coach of the Year in 1985 and 1986. He coached the team to consecutive seasons with 20 wins in both 2004–05 and 2005–06.

Career
Green was named as head coach by FDU in May 1983, succeeding J. Donald Feeley, whose recruiting had led to a team stocked with players who had academic problems.

Green led the team to a 21–10 record in the 1984–85 season. The team won in the ECAC Metro Conference and earned itself a berth in the 1985 NCAA tournament, the first in team history. FDU lost to the top-seeded University of Michigan by a score of 59–55 in the tourney's first round.

His last two seasons with the Knights were described by The Record as "two of the worst of Green's career", with the team going 8–20 in 2007–08, which deteriorated to 7–23 (3–13 in conference play) in 2008–09, in what turned out to be his final season as head coach. The team missed the Northeast Conference playoffs in both seasons, and his 400th win in the final game of the 2007–08 season was one of the few highlights of these seasons.

With one year remaining on his contract, Green was dismissed by FDU athletic director David Langford, who recognized Green's contributions and noted that "Coach Green has worked for FDU for 26 years and done a lot of good things, and helped the university with its visibility and we're very thankful to him for that." Green criticized the circumstances of his dismissal, stating that "This decision kills my career" and that he had hoped to spend some five more years coaching and had built up a healthy team for the 2009–10 season that he had already begun practices with during the spring.

Green then took the job as head coach at The City College of New York in the 2011–12 season. He replaced Andy Stampfel, who coached the last CCNY men's basketball conference championship team back in 2003. Under Green, the team reached the playoffs four times, including a trip to the CUNY Athletic Conference Championship Game in 2017 after posting a 17–10 record. The CCNY Beavers lost to Staten Island 77–66, but Green's 2016–2017 season was CCNY's best single-season record since the 1950–51 championship team that was involved in a point-shaving scandal. Following a severe slash to the CCNY athletic department's budget, Green resigned as head coach in the summer of 2017.

References

1949 births
Living people
American men's basketball players
Basketball coaches from Pennsylvania
Basketball players from Pennsylvania
CCNY Beavers men's basketball coaches
College men's basketball head coaches in the United States
Drew Rangers men's basketball coaches
Fairleigh Dickinson Knights men's basketball coaches
People from Brockway, Pennsylvania
Syracuse Orange men's basketball coaches
Syracuse Orange men's basketball players
Tulane Green Wave men's basketball coaches
Point guards